Midden is an old dump for domestic waste associated with past human occupation.

Midden may also refer to:

 Packrat midden, a debris pile constructed by a woodrat
 Privy midden, a toilet system that consisted of a privy associated with a midden (or middenstead)
 Dung midden, an animal toilet area or dunghill, also serving as a territorial marker
 The Midden, a quarterly journal published by the Archaeological Society of British Columbia since 1968

See also 
 Landfill
 Waste management
 Animal latrine